F.C. Haifa Robi Shapira, also known as Hapoel Robi Haifa is an Israeli football club based in Haifa. The club was formed in 2014 by Hapoel Haifa supporters, opposed to Hapoel Haifa owner, Yoav Katz. The club is currently playing in Liga Alef North division.

Origins and formation
Hapoel Haifa was established in 1924 and enjoyed considerable success during its existence, winning the Israel State Cup four times, as well as several minor cups and spending most of its time in the Israeli top division. In 1992, the club was bought by businessman Robi Shapira, who led the club to its first championship in 1998–99.

Robi Shapira committed suicide in December 2001, and the club was managed by temporary liquidators until 2004, when it was bought by businessman Yoav Katz. Since 2004 a core of fans opposing Katz's regime has formed, and in 2014 an alternate association was formed by the opposing fans, called "Ir Hapo'alim" (City of Laborers), through which the club, initially called informally Hapoel Robi Haifa, was formed.

In August 2014 the club was registered with the IFA. However, the IFA rejected the club choice of name since the name is registered with Hapoel Haifa's youth team, playing in the Israeli Noar Premier League. The club therefore settled on the name "F.C. Haifa Robi Shapira", and was registered to the Shomron division of Liga Gimel.

During 2014–15 season, Hapoel association had authorized F.C. Haifa to add the association's name "Hapoel" to the club's name. Therefore, in the 2015–16 season, the club will be called "Hapoel Robi Shapira Haifa".

History
On 12 September 2014 the club played it first official match, beating Hapoel Tirat HaCarmel 3–0 in the second round of the State Cup.

The club finished the 2014–15 season on top of Liga Gimel Samaria division, being undefeated throughout the whole season with 24 wins and 2 draws, and won promotion to Liga Bet.

The club finished his 2015–16 season on Liga Bet also in the first place, with 22 wins, 4 draws and 4 losses. The club was promoted to the 3rd league, Liga Alef.

Shirt Sponsors and manufacturers

Current squad
 As of 10 February 2022

Honours

League

Cups

External links
F.C. Haifa Robi Shapira Israel Football Association 
Ir Hapoalim

References

Haifa
Football clubs in Haifa
Haifa
Hapoel Haifa F.C.
Association football clubs established in 2014
2014 establishments in Israel
Fan-owned football clubs